Fabrizio Parmigiano  was an Italian painter of the late-Baroque period. Born at Parma, he was assisted by his wife Ippolita. He specialized in landscapes.

References

Bibliography

18th-century Italian painters
Italian male painters
Italian Baroque painters
Painters from Parma
18th-century Italian male artists